Although there are nine known isotopes of helium (2He), only helium-3 and helium-4 are stable.

However, the isotopic abundance of helium varies greatly depending on its origin. Rocks from the Earth's crust have isotope ratios varying by as much as a factor of ten; this is used in geology to investigate the origin of rocks and the composition of the Earth's mantle. The different formation processes of the two stable isotopes of helium produce the differing isotope abundances.

Dilution refrigerators take advantage of the immiscibility of these two isotopes to achieve temperatures of a few millikelvins.

List of isotopes 

|-
| rowspan=2|
| rowspan=2 style="text-align:right" | 2
| rowspan=2 style="text-align:right" | 0
| rowspan="2" | 
| rowspan=2 | ≪ 
| p (> )
| 
| rowspan=2 | 0+#
| rowspan=2 |
| rowspan=2 | 
|-
| β+ (< )
| 
|-
| 
| style="text-align:right" | 2
| style="text-align:right" | 1
| 
| colspan=3 align=center|Stable
| 1/2+
| 
| [, ]
|-
| 
| style="text-align:right" | 2
| style="text-align:right" | 2
| 
| colspan=3 align=center|Stable
| 0+
| 
| [, ]
|-
| 
| style="text-align:right" | 2
| style="text-align:right" | 3
| 
| []
| n
| 
| 3/2−
|
|
|-
| rowspan=2|
| rowspan=2 style="text-align:right" | 2
| rowspan=2 style="text-align:right" | 4
| rowspan=2|
| rowspan=2|
| β− (%)
| 
| rowspan=2|0+
| rowspan=2|
| rowspan=2|
|-
| β−d (%)
| 
|-
| 
| style="text-align:right" | 2
| style="text-align:right" | 5
| 
| []
| n
| 
| (3/2)−
|
|
|-
| rowspan=3|
| rowspan=3 style="text-align:right" | 2
| rowspan=3 style="text-align:right" | 6
| rowspan=3|
| rowspan=3|
| β−
| 
| rowspan=3|0+
| rowspan=3|
| rowspan=3|
|-
| β−n
| 
|-
| β−t
| 
|-
| 
| style="text-align:right" | 2
| style="text-align:right" | 7
| 
| 
| n
| 
| 1/2(+)
|
|
|-
| 
| style="text-align:right" | 2
| style="text-align:right" | 8
| 
| []
| 2n
| 
| 0+
|
|

Helium-2 (diproton) 
Its nucleus, a diproton, consists of two protons with no neutrons. According to theoretical calculations, it would have been much more stable (although still undergoing β+ decay to deuterium) if the strong interaction had been 2% greater. Its instability is due to spin–spin interactions in the nuclear force, and the Pauli exclusion principle, which forces the two protons to have anti-aligned spins and gives the diproton a negative binding energy.

In 2000, physicists first observed a new type of radioactive decay in which a nucleus emits two protons at once—perhaps a  nucleus. The team led by Alfredo Galindo-Uribarri of the Oak Ridge National Laboratory announced that the discovery will help scientists understand the strong nuclear force and provide fresh insights into the creation of elements inside stars. Galindo-Uribarri and co-workers chose an isotope of neon with an energy structure that prevents it from emitting protons one at a time. This means that the two protons are ejected simultaneously. The team fired a beam of fluorine ions at a proton-rich target to produce , which then decayed into oxygen and two protons. Any protons ejected from the target itself were identified by their characteristic energies. There are two ways in which the two-proton emission may proceed. The neon nucleus might eject a "diproton"—a pair of protons bundled together as a  nucleus—which then decays into separate protons. Alternatively, the protons may be emitted separately but simultaneously—so-called "democratic decay". The experiment was not sensitive enough to establish which of these two processes was taking place.

A beam of  ions was directed at a target of beryllium foil. This collision converted some of the heavier neon nuclei in the beam into  nuclei. These nuclei then collided with a foil of lead. The second collision had the effect of exciting the  nucleus into a highly unstable condition. As in the earlier experiment at Oak Ridge, the  nucleus decayed into an  nucleus, plus two protons detected exiting from the same direction. The new experiment showed that the two protons were initially ejected together, correlated in a quasibound 1S configuration, before decaying into separate protons much less than a nanosecond later.

Further evidence comes from RIKEN in Japan and the Joint Institute for Nuclear Research in Dubna, Russia, where beams of  nuclei were directed at a cryogenic hydrogen target to produce . It was discovered that the  nucleus can donate all four of its neutrons to the hydrogen. The two remaining protons could be simultaneously ejected from the target as a  nucleus, which quickly decayed into two protons. A similar reaction has also been observed from  nuclei colliding with hydrogen.

 is an intermediate in the first step of the proton–proton chain reaction. The first step of the proton–proton chain reaction is a two-stage process; first, two protons fuse to form a diproton:
 +  +  → ,
followed by the immediate beta-plus decay of the diproton to deuterium:
 →  +  + ,
with the overall formula
 +  →  +  + .
The hypothetical effect of the binding of the diproton on Big Bang and stellar nucleosynthesis has been investigated. Some models suggest that variations in the strong force allowing the existence of a bound diproton would enable the conversion of all primordial hydrogen to helium in the Big Bang, with catastrophic consequences on the development of stars and life. This proposition is used as an example of the anthropic principle. However, a 2009 study suggests that such a conclusion cannot be drawn, as the formed diprotons would still decay to deuterium, whose binding energy would also increase. In some scenarios, it is postulated that hydrogen (in the form of deuterium) could still survive in relatively large quantities, rebutting arguments that the strong force is tuned within a precise anthropic limit.

Helium-3 

Trace amounts are also produced by the beta decay of tritium. In stars, however,  is more abundant, a product of nuclear fusion.

This difference is explained by quantum statistics, since helium-3 atoms are fermions, while helium-4 atoms are bosons, which condense to a superfluid more easily.

Helium-4 

The most common isotope, is produced on Earth by alpha decay of heavier radioactive elements; the alpha particles that emerge are fully ionized  nuclei.  is an unusually stable nucleus because its nucleons are arranged into complete shells. It was also formed in enormous quantities during Big Bang nucleosynthesis.

Terrestrial helium consists almost exclusively of this isotope.

Heavier helium isotopes 
Although all heavier helium isotopes decay with a half-life of less than one second, researchers have used particle accelerator collisions to create unusual atomic nuclei for elements such as helium, lithium and nitrogen. The unusual nuclear structures of such isotopes may offer insight into the isolated properties of neutrons.

The most widely studied heavy helium isotope is helium-8. Halo nuclei have become an area of intense research. Isotopes up to helium-10, with two protons and eight neutrons, have been confirmed. , despite being a doubly magic isotope, has a very short half-life; it is not particle-bound and near-instantaneously drips out two neutrons.

References

External links 
General Tables — abstracts for helium and other exotic light nuclei

 
Helium
Helium